Yogendra Narain (born 26 June 1942) is a 1965 batch retired Indian Administrative Service (IAS) officer of Uttar Pradesh cadre. He is a former Secretary General of the Rajya Sabha. He also served as the Defence Secretary of India, Chief Secretary of Uttar Pradesh, Surface Transport Secretary of India. He is the current Chancellor of Hemwati Nandan Bahuguna Garhwal University (HNBGU) situated in Pauri Garhwal district of Uttrakhand. From 2007 to 2017, he was serving as Director at Reliance Power and Reliance Infrastructure.

Education
Yogendra Narain holds a diploma in Development Economics. He is also a graduate (BSc) in Physical Chemistry and a postgraduate (MA) in Political Science. He also holds MPhil and PhD degrees.

Career 
Yogendra Narain served in various key positions for both the Government of India and the Government of Uttar Pradesh, like as the Chief Secretary of Uttar Pradesh, first Chairman of Greater NOIDA, Principal Secretary (Information), Principal Secretary to the Chief Minister of Uttar Pradesh, Principal Secretary to the Governor of Uttar Pradesh, Secretary (Power and Irrigation) and as the District Magistrate and Collector of Lucknow and Muzaffarnagar districts in the Government of Uttar Pradesh, and as the Union Defence Secretary, Union Surface Transport Secretary, first Chairman of National Highways Authority of India and as the Joint Secretary (Ports) in the Ministry of Surface Transport in the Union Government.

Surface Transport Secretary 
Narain was appointed as the Union Surface Transport Secretary by the Appointments Committee of the Cabinet (ACC), he assumed the office on 1 April 1997 and demitted it on 1 April 1998.

Chief Secretary of Uttar Pradesh 
Narain was appointed as the Chief Secretary of Uttar Pradesh by the Chief Minister of Uttar Pradesh, he assumed the office on Chief Secretary on 2 April 1998 and demitted it on 20 October 2000, serving as the state's top bureaucrat for more than two years.

Defence Secretary 
Narain was appointed as the Union Defence Secretary by the Appointments Committee of the Cabinet, he assumed the office on 20 October 2000 and demitted it on 30 June 2002.

Secretary-General of Rajya Sabha 
Narain was appointed as the Secretary General of the Rajya Sabha, the upper house of the Indian Parliament by the Vice President of India and ex-officio Chairman of Rajya Sabha, he assumed the office of 1 September 2002 and demitted it on 14 September 2007.

Awards 
 Dean Paul H. Appleby Award – given for distinguished civil service.

See also 

 Israel Jebasingh

References

External links 
 Executive Record Sheet as maintained by Department of Personnel and Training of Government of India

Indian Administrative Service officers
1942 births
Living people
Defence Secretaries of India
Chief Secretaries of Uttar Pradesh
People from Uttar Pradesh
District magistrate